Margam Halt railway station served the steelworks in Margam, Neath Port Talbot, Wales from 1948 to 1964 on the South Wales Main Line.

History 
The station opened on 4 February 1948 by British Railways. It closed to both passengers and good traffic on 2 November 1964.

References

External links 

Disused railway stations in Neath Port Talbot
Railway stations opened by British Rail
Railway stations in Great Britain opened in 1948
Railway stations in Great Britain closed in 1964
1964 disestablishments in Wales